Julius L. Shaneson (born July 24, 1944, Richmond, Virginia) is an American mathematician. He works at the University of Pennsylvania, where he was department chair from 2002 to 2006 and is currently the Class of 1939 Professor of Mathematics.

Education and career
Shaneson earned his Ph.D. in 1968 from the University of Chicago, under the supervision of Melvin Rothenberg. He taught at Rutgers University before joining the University of Pennsylvania; his students at Rutgers included Abigail Thompson.

Recognition
Shaneson was a Guggenheim Fellow in 1981. He was an invited speaker at the International Congress of Mathematicians in 1982 and 1996. In March 2005, a conference was held at the Courant Institute of Mathematical Sciences of New York University, in honor of his 60th birthday.

He was included in the 2019 class of fellows of the American Mathematical Society "for contributions to topology".

Selected publications
 .
 .
 .

References

1944 births
Living people
20th-century American mathematicians
21st-century American mathematicians
University of Chicago alumni
Rutgers University faculty
University of Pennsylvania faculty
Mathematicians at the University of Pennsylvania
People from Richmond, Virginia
Mathematicians from Virginia
Fellows of the American Mathematical Society